Sony Pictures Worldwide Acquisitions (SPWA) is a specialty film division of Sony Pictures. The company specializes in acquiring and producing films for a wide variety of distribution platforms.

History 
The group became a stand-alone division of Sony Pictures in 2007. Originally being called as Sony Pictures Worldwide Acquisitions Group (SPWAG), the group's name was changed to "Sony Pictures Worldwide Acquisitions" (SPWA) in late 2010. The group had sometimes been called "Sony Pictures Entertainment (SPE) Worldwide Acquisitions Group".

SPWA produces and acquires about 60 films per year, usually through Stage 6 Films, Affirm Films, and Destination Films. SPWA releases some of its films theatrically; the group would analyze how much a theatrical release would impact a film's TV, VOD and home video revenue, and then the group would determine whether the film should bows theatrically.

In the case of theatrical releases, SPWA will offer the films to Sony's distribution labels (i.e. TriStar Pictures, Screen Gems, Columbia Pictures, and Sony Pictures Classics) firstly; then, if Sony's distribution labels pass on the films, the company will release the films through other distributors.

Select United States theatrical releases

2000s 
 Paprika (2007) (production of Madhouse)
 Daddy Day Camp (2007) (production of Revolution Studios)
 Revolver (2007) (production of EuropaCorp. Co-released with Samuel Goldwyn Films)
 Rise: Blood Hunter (2007) (production of Ghost House Pictures. Co-released with Samuel Goldwyn Films)
 Seraphim Falls (2007) (production of Icon Productions. Co-released with Samuel Goldwyn Films)
 Slipstream (2007) (Independently produced. Co-released with Strand Releasing)
 Southland Tales (2007) (production of Darko Entertainment and Wild Bunch. Co-released with Samuel Goldwyn Films)
 Tekkon Kinkreet (2007) (production on behalf of Studio 4C)
 The Nines (2007) (production of Newmarket Films)
 We Own The Night (2007) (production of 2929 Productions)
 Dark Streets (2008) (production of Capture Film International. Co-released with Samuel Goldwyn Films)
 Kabluey (2008) (Independently produced. Co-released with Regent Releasing)
 Elegy (2008) (production of Lakeshore Entertainment. Co-released with Samuel Goldwyn Films)
 Fireproof (2008) (production of Sherwood Pictures. Co-released with Samuel Goldwyn Films)
 Kabluey (2008) (Independently produced. Co-released with Regent Releasing)
 Married Life (2008) (production of Sidney Kimmel Entertainment and Anonymous Content)
 The Perfect Holiday (2008) (production of Flavor Unit Films. Co-released with Yari Film Group)
 Black Dynamite (2009) (production of Ars Nova. Co-released with Apparition)
 Blood: The Last Vampire (2009) (production of East Wing Holdings Corp. and SAJ. Co-released with Samuel Goldwyn Films)
 District 9 (2009) (production of WingNut Films and QED International)
 Moon  (2009) (production of Liberty Films UK)
 Planet 51  (2009) (production of Ilion Animation Studios and HandMade Films)
 The Boondock Saints II: All Saints Day (2009) (Independently produced. Co-released with Apparition)
 The Imaginarium of Doctor Parnassus (2009) (production of Davis Films and Infinity Features)
 The Young Victoria (2009) (production of GK Films. Co-released with Apparition)

2010s 
 To Save A Life (2010) (production of New Song Pictures. Co-released with Samuel Goldwyn Films)
 Chloe (2010) (production of StudioCanal and The Montecito Picture Company)
 Defendor (2010) (production of  Alliance Films and Darius Films)
 Faster (2010) (production of CBS Films and Castle Rock Entertainment)
 Harry Brown (2010) (production of Hanway Films. Co-released with Samuel Goldwyn Films)
 Legion (2010) (production of Bold Films)
 REC 2 (2010) (production of Filmax Entertainment and Castelao Productions)
 Red Hill (2010) (production of Arclight Films and Screen Australia. Co-released with Strand Releasing)
 The Tourist (2010) (production of GK Films and Spyglass Entertainment)
 Welcome to the Rileys (2010) (production of Scott Free Productions and Argonaut Pictures. Co-released with Samuel Goldwyn Films)
 A Good Old Fashioned Orgy (2011) (production of Endgame Entertainment. Co-released with Samuel Goldwyn Films)
 Attack the Block (2011) (production of Film4 and StudioCanal)
 Bloodworth (2011) (Independently produced. Co-released with Samuel Goldwyn Films)
 Colombiana (2011) (production of EuropaCorp)
 Courageous (2011) (production of Sherwood Pictures and Provident Films)
 Elektra Luxx (2011) (production of Gato Negro Films. Co-released with Samuel Goldwyn Films)
 Insidious (2011) (production of Alliance Films and IM Global. Co-released with FilmDistrict)
 Jumping the Broom (2011) (Produced in-house)
 Midnight in Paris (2011) (production of Mediapro)
 POM Wonderful Presents: The Greatest Movie Ever Sold (2011) (production of Snoot Entertainment and Warrior Poets)
 Salvation Boulevard (2011) (production of Mandalay Pictures. Co-released with IFC Films)
 Soul Surfer (2011) (production of Mandalay Pictures, Enticing Entertainment and Brookwell/McNamara Entertainment. Co-released with FilmDistrict)
 The Grace Card (2011) (production of Provident Films. Co-released with Samuel Goldwyn Films)
 Bel Ami (2012) (production of Protagonist Pictures and Rai Cinema. Co-released with Magnolia Pictures)
 Detention (2012) (Independently produced. Co-released with Samuel Goldwyn Films)
 Looper (2012) (production of Endgame Entertainment and DMG Entertainment. Co-released with FilmDistrict)
 Meeting Evil (2012) (production of Motion Picture Corporation of America. Co-released with Magnolia Pictures)
 The Pirates! Band of Misfits (2012) (production of Aardman Animations)
 Red Dawn (2012) (production of Metro-Goldwyn-Mayer, United Artists, Contrafilm, and Vincent Newman Entertainment. Co-released with FilmDistrict)
 Robot & Frank (2012) (production of Park Pictures. Co-released with Samuel Goldwyn Films)
 The Raid: Redemption (2012) (production of XYZ Films, Celluloid Nightmares and P.T. Merantau Films)
 Sparkle (2012) (Produced in-house)
 The First Time (2012) (production of Jerimaca Films. Co-released with Samuel Goldwyn Films)
 Tonight You're Mine (2012) (production of BBC Films, Sigma Films and Creative Scotland. Co-released with Roadside Attractions)
 Lake Placid: The Final Chapter (2012)
 Universal Soldier: Day of Reckoning (2012) (production of Foresight Unlimited. Co-released with Magnolia Pictures)
 A Dark Truth (2013) (production of RollerCoaster Entertainment. Co-released with Magnolia Pictures)
 Austenland (2013) (production of Fickle Fish Films)
 The Call (2013) (production of WWE Studios and Troika Pictures)
 Cold Comes the Night (2013) (Independently produced. Co-released with Samuel Goldwyn Films)
 Elysium (2013) (production of Media Rights Capital)
 Evil Dead (2013) (production of Ghost House Pictures and FilmDistrict)
 Insidious Chapter 2 (2013) (production of Blumhouse Productions and Entertainment One. Co-released with FilmDistrict)
 Stalingrad (2014) (production of Russia One and Cinema Fund)
 Pompeii (2014) (production of Impact Pictures and Constantin Film, co-release with FilmDistrict )
 Moms' Night Out (2014) (production of Provident Films and Pure Flix Entertainment)
 When the Game Stands Tall (2014) (production of Mandalay Pictures)
 The Raid 2: Berandal (2014) (production of XYZ Films, Celluloid Nightmares and P.T. Merantau Films)
 The Remaining (2014) (distributed by Affirm Films)
 Predestination (2014) (production of Blacklab Entertainment, Screen Australia and Wolfhound Pictures)
 Insidious: Chapter 3 (2015) (co-distributed by Gramercy Pictures)
 The End of The Tour (2015) (distributed on behalf of A24 Films).
 The Final Girls (2015) (distributed by Vertical Entertainment and Stage 6 Films).
 Ratter (2016) (distributed by Destination Films and Vertical Entertainment)
 The Bronze (2016) (distributed by Sony Pictures Classics)
  Elvis and Nixon (2016) (distributed by Amazon Studios and Bleecker Street)
  Arrival (2016) (U.S distribution by Paramount Pictures, co-international distribution with Stage 6 Films)
 Sleepless (2017) (production of Open Road Films. Co-Canadian distribution with Stage 6 Films)
 Free Fire (distributed by A24)
 Band Aid (distributed by IFC Films)
 Fallen (co-distributed by Vertical Entertainment)
 Professor Marston & The Wonder Women (co-distributed by Annapurna Pictures)
 November Criminals (co-distributed by Vertical Entertainment)
 Insidious: The Last Key  (co-distribution by Universal Pictures)
 Golden Exits
 Gemini (distributed by Neon)
 Disobedience
Hearts Beat Loud
 Boundaries
 The Tomorrow Man (distributed by Bleecker Street)
 The Wedding Guest (distributed by IFC Films)
 Them That Follow (distributed by 1091 Media)
 The Sound of Silence (distributed by IFC Films)

2020s 
 The Glorias (distributed by Roadside Attractions and LD Entertainment)
 Sound of Metal (distributed by Amazon Studios)
 Saint Maud (distributed by A24)
 Zola (distributed by A24)
 Yellow Rose
 Ammonite (distributed by Neon)
 Run This Town
 Little Fish (distributed by IFC Films)
 The World to Come (distributed by Bleecker Street)
 Long Weekend
 Together Together (distributed by Bleecker Street)
 Here Today
Infinite Storm (distributed by Bleecker Street)
 Dream Horse (distributed by Bleecker Street in the U.S. and Warner Bros. Pictures in the U.K.)
 A Mouthful of Air

Upcoming Releases

2022 
 Joyride

References 

Sony Pictures Entertainment Motion Picture Group
Sony Pictures Entertainment